18.05.2009 (read as 18 May 2009) is a 2018 Indian Tamil-language war drama film written and directed by K Ganeshan.The film is about the bloody end to the Sri Lankan Civil War .K Ganeshan states he believes he has the “blessings of the thousands of Tamils who were massacred by the Sri Lankan Army on May 18, 2009.” 
Dhaanya made her acting debut through this film which she depicted it as a difficult debut. She plays a journalist in the film.

The music for the film is composed by veteran music director Ilaiyaraaja.

Cast 
Subash Chandra Bose
Dhaanya as Tamilselvi

Soundtrack
"Ethanai Ethanai Kodumai" - Ilaiyaraaja

Release 
The film released on 18 May 2018. Actress Dhanya received death threats for acting nude in the film. Maalai Malar praised the director's intention, the performances of the film's cast, and the film's soundtrack.

References

External links 
 

2018 films
2010s Tamil-language films
Films about the Sri Lankan Civil War
Indian war drama films
Indian films based on actual events
Films scored by Ilaiyaraaja